Karl Friedrich may refer to:

 Karl Friedrich, Grand Duke of Baden (1728–1811)
 Karl Friedrich, Duke of Holstein-Gottorp (1700–1739)
 Karl Friedrich, Duke of Saxe-Meiningen (1712–1743)
 Karl Friedrich, Prince of Hohenzollern (born 1952)
 Karl Friedrich (tenor) (1905–1981)
 Karl Friedrich, Prince of Hohenzollern-Sigmaringen (1724–1785)

See also
 Karl Friedrich Eichhorn (1781–1854), German jurist
 Carl Friedrich (disambiguation)